Edmund Ho Hau-wah, GOIH, GML, GCM (born 13 March 1955) is a Macau politician who served as the first Chief Executive of the Macau Special Administrative Region from 1999 to 2009. He currently serves as a Vice-Chairman of the Chinese People's Political Consultative Conference.

Edmund Ho was made Chief Executive-elect on 15 May 1999 by the Selection Committee for the Chief Executive of the Macau SAR. He was appointed Chief Executive-designate on 20 May of the same year by the Premier of the State Council, Zhu Rongji, and was formally sworn in as Chief Executive at the special ceremony marking the establishment of the Macau SAR on 20 December 1999.

Biography 
Ho was born on 13 March 1955 in Portuguese Macau, to parents of Cantonese descent and origin with family roots in Panyu, Guangzhou in neighbouring Guangdong. He is the son of the prominent Macanese community leader and businessman, Ho Yin, and Chan Keng (陳瓊). He is married, with a son and a daughter.

Education
After completing his primary education, Ho went to study in Canada in 1969. He went on to graduate with a degree in Bachelor of Business Administration from York University, Faculty of Administrative Studies (now known as Schulich School of Business) in 1978, and qualified as a chartered accountant and certified auditor in 1981. After working for a couple of years in an accounting firm in India, he was transferred to the United States in 1982.

Career in business
Ho returned to Macau and started himself on a business and political career in 1983, undertaking social activities and community service. His business interests ranged from accounting, finance and banking, insurance, public transportation, mass media, technology, land development to public utilities and he assumed various positions as auditor with KPMG, executive director and general manager of Tai Fung Bank (大豐銀行), chairman of Transmac, vice-chairman of the board of directors of Macau International Airport Company (CAM), vice-chairman of the General Assembly of Air Macau, chairman of the board of the MASC Ogden Aviation Services, vice-president of the board of directors of Teledifusão de Macau (Macau Television) among others.

Politics
Ho's political career began in 1986, when he became a member of the Chinese People's Political Consultative Conference (CPPCC). Two years later, he was elected deputy to the National People's Congress (NPC). He was elected to the Standing Committee of both the eighth and ninth NPCs.

Ho then joined the local legislature in 1988, and was Vice-President of the Legislative Council of Macau for 11 consecutive years (1988–1999).

Ho had been involved in the preparatory work for Macau's return to the People's Republic of China ever since the Sino-Portuguese Joint Declaration on the Question of Macau came into effect. He was appointed Vice-President of the Drafting Committee of the Basic Law of the Macau Special Administrative Region (MSAR) of the People's Republic of China in 1988. The following year, he became Vice-President of the Consultative Committee of the Basic Law of the MSAR. He was appointed Vice-President of the Preparatory Committee of the MSAR in 1998. Ho was also Convenor of the Land Fund Investment Commission of the MSAR of the PRC.

Over the years, Ho has been leader of a number of industrial, financial, educational, charity and sports institutions and associations. He was Chairman of the Macau Association of Banks from its foundation in 1985, Vice-President of the Macau Chamber of Commerce, Vice-Chairman of the All-China Federation of Industry and Commerce, Vice-President of the Economic Council of the Macau Government, Vice-Chairman of the Kiang Wu Hospital Board of Charity, Vice-Chairman of the Tung Sin Tong Charitable Institution, chairman of the board of directors of the University of Macau, Vice-chairman of the board of directors of Jinan University, Guangzhou, President of the Executive Committee of the Macau Olympic Committee, and President of the Macau Golf Association.

Election results

Legislative Assembly

Chief Executive

References

External links
Biography from the government website

1955 births
Living people
Chief Executives of Macau
Members of the 6th Chinese People's Political Consultative Conference
Delegates to the 7th National People's Congress
Members of the Standing Committee of the 8th National People's Congress
Members of the Standing Committee of the 9th National People's Congress
Delegates to the National People's Congress from Macau
Schulich School of Business alumni
Members of the Legislative Assembly of Macau
Government ministers of Macau
Grand Crosses of the Order of Merit (Portugal)
Macau people of Portuguese descent
Vice Chairpersons of the National Committee of the Chinese People's Political Consultative Conference
York University alumni